Mel Gray may refer to:
Mel Gray (journalist), managing editor of Air Force Times
Mel Gray (return specialist) (born 1961), former American football return specialist
Mel Gray (wide receiver) (born 1948), former American football wide receiver